Spooky College is a 2023 Indian Kannada-language psychological horror thriller film directed by Bharath GB and starring Kushee Ravi and Vivek Simha.

Cast 
Kushee Ravi as Khushi 
Vivek Simha as Rishikumar
Prithvi Rashtrakuta
Prakash Belawadi
Raghu Ramanakoppa
Vijay Chendoor 
Hanumante Gowda
Aravind Bolar
Sharanya Shetty
Sudhindra
Sidlingu Sridhar as Lobo
Reeshma Nanaiah (special appearance in the song "Mellusure Savigana")

Production 
The film was shot in 2020 at a college in Dharwad and a forest in Dandeli.

Release 
The film was initially scheduled to release on 25 November 2022.

Reception
A critic from The Times of India wrote that "The film is recommended only if you are into a guessing game". A critic from The New Indian Express wrote that "Spooky College would have worked better as a decent dive into exploring young minds, however, the film doesn’t just shine that bright a light on this pertinent issue". A critic from OTT Play wrote that "And even as a surface-level horror film, the film fails from evoking scares - unless you have a lot of time to kill, consider giving the film giving a miss".

References